The men's team épée was one of ten fencing events on the fencing at the 2000 Summer Olympics programme. The competition was held on 22 September 2000. 28 fencers from 8 nations competed.

Main tournament bracket

The field of 8 teams competed in a single-elimination tournament to determine the medal winners.  Semifinal losers proceeded to a bronze medal match. Matches were also conducted to determine the final team placements.

Classification 5-8

References

External links
 Official Report of the 2000 Sydney Summer Olympics

Foil team
Men's events at the 2000 Summer Olympics